CICAR may refer to:

 Cooperative Institute for Climate Applications and Research
 Cooperative Investigation of the Caribbean and Adjacent Regions
 Centre for Indian Christian Archaeological Research